Petra Buzková (born 7 December 1965) is a former Minister of Education, Youth and Sports in the Czech cabinet. She belongs to the Czech Social Democratic Party. In 1992-2006 she was a member of the Chamber of Deputies.

Buzková obtained her Doctor of Laws degree from the Charles University in 1989. After her political career she continued her in steps of her education and became a lawyer in AKVKS.

Personal life 
Petra Buzková is living in Prague (Czech Republic) with her husband Josef Kotrba who is a financial advisor.

Sources
 CV of Petra Buzková

1965 births
Living people
Education ministers of the Czech Republic
Czech Social Democratic Party MPs
Women government ministers of the Czech Republic
20th-century Czech women politicians
Politicians from Prague
Czech women lawyers
Charles University alumni
Members of the Chamber of Deputies of the Czech Republic (1992–1996)
Members of the Chamber of Deputies of the Czech Republic (1996–1998)
Members of the Chamber of Deputies of the Czech Republic (1998–2002)
Members of the Chamber of Deputies of the Czech Republic (2002–2006)
21st-century Czech women politicians
20th-century Czech lawyers